Food for Thought is the only studio album by American rapper and singer Jerome Jones of the group Immature/IMx (credited as Young Rome). The album was released in the U.S. on June 22, 2004. Two singles were released from the album: "After Party" and "Freaky". The album features guest appearances by Omarion, YoungBloodZ, and fellow Immature/IMx member Marques Houston, among others.

History
Young Rome's opinion of this album is that, "It's far from what Immature did. It's more mature—more about my personal life and what I've been through. I sing about the ups and downs of being in the group, of what's happening with my family and going through stuff. This album shows all of me—the adversity and everything else."

In the United States, Food for Thought debuted at number 98 on the Billboard 200 and peaked at number 32 on Billboards Top R&B/Hip-Hop Albums.

Track listing
 "Intro" – 2:06
 "Freaky" (featuring Guerilla Black) 1 – 3:56
 "I Don't Care" (featuring YoungBloodZ) – 5:01
 "After Party" (featuring Omarion & Marques Houston) 1 – 4:14
 "In My Bedroom (Interlude)" – 2:46
 "In My Bedroom" (featuring O'Ryan)– 4:22
 "Crazy Girl" (featuring Rufus Blaq) – 3:26
 "Sexapade" (featuring Marques Houston and Smooth) – 3:19
 "2 Step (Intro)" – 0:10
 "2 Step" – 3:48
 "Best Days" – 4:14
 "Clap" (featuring Rufus Blaq)– 3:51
 "In My Car" – 2:14
 "Wha Cha Doin' Tonight" (featuring Marques Houston) – 3:54
 "Look Down on Me" – 2:49Bonus tracks'
 "Back It Up" – 6:32

References

2004 debut albums
Universal Records albums
Pop-rap albums